Riggs Glacier is a glacier in Glacier Bay National Park and Preserve in the U.S. state of Alaska. It begins on the southern slope of the Takhinsha Mountains, 6 km (4 mi) southeast of Mount Harris and flows south-southeast to the head of Muir Inlet, 69 km (43 mi) southwest of Skagway.

It was named by the American Geographical Society in 1947 for Thomas Riggs, Jr., Governor of Alaska from 1918 to 1921.

See also
 List of glaciers

Cited references

Glaciers of Glacier Bay National Park and Preserve
Glaciers of Hoonah–Angoon Census Area, Alaska
Glaciers of Unorganized Borough, Alaska